Leetsdale is a borough in Allegheny County, Pennsylvania, along the Ohio River. It is part of the Pittsburgh Metro Area. The population was 1,162 at the 2020 census.

History
Leetsdale was incorporated on March 28, 1904. Leetsdale at one time had a formidable industrial manufacturing base, with a Bethlehem Steel mill that closed in the late 1970s. The site of the mill on the shore of the Ohio River is now the Leetsdale Industrial Park, or the Port of Leetsdale, and is home to facilities leased, by The Buncher Company, to a number of companies of varying sizes. The Leetsdale Industrial Park was largely a brownfield until the 1990s. Today, only a few of the original buildings still stand. The river shore where the park was built is littered with abandoned and run-down machinery from the Bethlehem Steel days. In 2022, CGI Steel and Nextracker renovated 
an abandoned steel factory to produce solar tracker equipments 

Leetsdale is also home to Elmridge, or the James Gardiner Coffin/John Walker house, which is listed on the National Register of Historic Places.

Geography
Leetsdale is located at  (40.566667, -80.211274).

Surrounding communities
Leetsdale is bordered by Ambridge in Beaver County to the north, Leet Township to the northeast, and Edgeworth to the southeast. The borough includes the former town of Shields. The Ohio River forms the southwest border of the borough; across the river is Crescent Township.

Government and politics

On November 18, 2021, Democratic mayor Peter Poninsky, who had been mayor of the town for 19 years, lost his reelection bid to fellow Democrat Sandra Ford.

Demographics

As of the 2000 United States census, there were 1,232 people, 586 households, and 370 families residing in the borough. The racial makeup of the borough was 89.20% White, 7.31% African American, 0.65% from other races, and 2.84% from two or more races. Hispanic or Latino of any race were 1.62% of the population.

There were 586 households, out of which 23.6% had children under the age of 18 living with them, 41.7% were married couples living together, 14.1% had a female householder with no husband present, and 40.8% were non-families. 38.0% of all households were made up of individuals, and 21.4% had someone living alone who was 65 years of age or older. The average household size was 2.14 and the average family size was 2.80.

In the borough the population was spread out, with 21.3% under the age of 18, 6.2% from 18 to 24, 26.9% from 25 to 44, 22.7% from 45 to 64, and 22.8% who were 65 years of age or older. The median age was 43 years. For every 100 females, there were 80.4 males. For every 100 females age 18 and over, there were 74.6 males.

The median income for a household in the borough was $28,672, and the median income for a family was $37,500. Males had a median income of $31,932 versus $25,750 for females. The per capita income for the borough was $19,172. About 9.6% of families and 12.8% of the population were below the poverty line, including 22.1% of those under age 18 and 10.2% of those age 65 or over.

See also
List of cities and towns along the Ohio River

References

External links
 Borough of Leetsdale official website

Pennsylvania populated places on the Ohio River
Populated places established in 1827
Boroughs in Allegheny County, Pennsylvania
1827 establishments in Pennsylvania